The 2016 Liga Profesional de Primera División season, also known as the Campeonato Uruguayo Especial o Campeonato Transición, was the 113th season of Uruguay's top-flight football league, and the 86th in which it is professional. Peñarol was the defending champion.

Teams

Standings

Results

Top goalscorers

Source: Soccerway

Relegation

External links
Asociación Uruguaya de Fútbol - Campeonato Uruguayo 

2016
2016–17 in Uruguayan football
2016 in South American football leagues